Saint Mark's Coptic Orthodox Cathedral in Cairo is the seat of the Coptic Orthodox Pope.

Saint Mark's Coptic Orthodox Cathedral may also refer to:
 Saint Mark's Coptic Orthodox Cathedral (Alexandria), traditional seat of the Coptic Orthodox Pope
 Saint Mark's Coptic Orthodox Cathedral (Azbakeya), in Cairo, seat of the Coptic Pope from 1800 to 1971

See also 
 Saint Mark's Coptic Orthodox Church (disambiguation)